Fruitvale is a village in the West Kootenay region of southeastern British Columbia.

Early community
One of eight original stations on the Nelson and Fort Sheppard Railway opened in 1893, the location was named Beaver Siding. The name Fruitvale appeared in 1907, promoting a new subdivision. Despite the climate being unsuitable for fruit growing, the settlement prospered and was incorporated as a village in 1952.

Geography
The village of Fruitvale lies in the Beaver Valley, which is made up of Fruitvale, Beaver Falls, and Montrose.

Demographics 

Religion 
According to the 2021 census, religious groups in Fruitvale included:
Irreligion (1,150 persons or 60.7%)
Christianity (740 persons or 39.1%)

Schools
Fruitvale Elementary School serves students from kindergarten to grade 7.  High school students are bussed to J. Lloyd Crowe Secondary School in nearby Trail. Beaver Valley Middle School (formerly Beaver Valley Junior Secondary ) closed in 2002.

Sports
The KIJHL's Beaver Valley Nitehawks hockey team play in Fruitvale.  The village also has facilities for curling, bowling, soccer, golf, and baseball.

Notable people

Adam Deadmarsh, former NHL player – Colorado Avalanche and Los Angeles Kings
Barret Jackman, 2003 NHL Rookie of the Year
Laci J. Mailey, actress – Falling Skies, Chesapeake Shores
Ella Matteucci, ice hockey player – Markham Thunder (CWHL) and PWHPA
Paul Moller, inventor of the Skycar

References

External links

Designated places in British Columbia
Villages in British Columbia
Populated places in the West Kootenay